The Tunisia national ice hockey team is the national men's ice hockey team of Tunisia and an associate member of the International Ice Hockey Federation. Tunisia is currently not ranked in the IIHF World Ranking and has not entered in any World Championship tournaments.

History
The Tunisian Ice Hockey Association was founded in 2009. Tunisia played its first unofficial game on 14 June 2014, against a French club team, Coqs de Courbevoie in Courbevoie, France. They were defeated by them 6–5. Tunisia has not been active since their first unofficial game, but did not play at least one official game against other nation so far. On 22 September 2021, they became an official IIHF member.

Tournament record

World Championships

African Ice Hockey Cup

All-time record against other clubs
Last match update: 14 June 2014

See also
Ice hockey in Africa
Algeria men's national ice hockey team
Morocco men's national ice hockey team
South Africa men's national ice hockey team

References

External links
IIHF profile

National ice hockey teams in Africa
Ice hockey
National ice hockey teams in the Arab world